Gorzyn may refer to the following places in Poland:
Gorzyń, Greater Poland Voivodeship
Górzyn, Lower Silesian Voivodeship
Górzyn, Lubusz Voivodeship